Qeshlaq-e Qaneh (also Romanized as Qeshlāq-e Qāneh; also known as Qeshlāq-e Qānlī Qūzī) is a village in Abish Ahmad Rural District, Abish Ahmad District, Kaleybar County, East Azerbaijan Province, Iran. At the 2006 census, its population was 29, in 5 families.

References 

Populated places in Kaleybar County